Rainbow snake may refer to:

Farancia erytrogramma, a species of snake native to the southeastern United States
Rainbow Serpent, an Aboriginal Australian religious figure